Hand to God is a play written by Robert Askins. The play was produced Off-Broadway in 2011 and 2014 and on Broadway in 2015. The Broadway production received five Tony Award nominations, including for Best New Play.

Productions
Hand to God premiered Off-Broadway at the Ensemble Studio Theatre in October 2011, and returned in February 2012.

Hand to God opened Off-Broadway at the Lucille Lortel Theatre on March 10, 2014, directed by Moritz von Stuelpnagel in an MCC Theater production.

Hand to God opened on Broadway at the Booth Theatre on April 7, 2015. The cast features Steven Boyer as Jason/Tyrone, Geneva Carr as Margery, Michael Oberholtzer as Timothy, Sarah Stiles as Jessica, and Marc Kudisch as Pastor Greg (a role later played by Bob Saget), with direction by Moritz von Stuelpnagel, sets by Beowulf Boritt, costumes by Sydney Maresca, and lighting by Jason Lyons. The original puppets were designed and built by Marte Johanne Ekhougen. It closed in the United States on January 3, 2016.

Hand to God opened in London at the Vaudeville Theatre on February 5, 2016, set to run through June 11, 2016. The cast featured Neil Pearson as Pastor Greg, Harry Melling as Jason/Tyrone, Janie Dee as Margery, Jemima Rooper as Jessica and Kevin Mains as Timmy. The show shortened its limited run; first to June 4, 2016 and then to April 30, 2016.

Concept
Hand to God is an "irreverent puppet comedy ...about a possessed Christian-ministry puppet." Author Robert Askins said that "Hand to God is an expression about honesty. It’s a southern regionalism that’s fairly unknown in the North."

Synopsis

In the devoutly religious, relatively quiet small town of Cypress, Texas, Margery is a widow whose husband has recently died. To keep her occupied, her minister, Pastor Greg, has asked her to run the puppet club. Fundamentalist Christian congregations often use puppets to teach children how to follow the Bible and avoid Satan. The teenage members of the club are her son Jason; Jessica, the girl next door that Jason has a crush on; and Timmy, the neighborhood troublemaker whose mother is attending Alcoholics Anonymous meetings at the church. Pastor Greg wants the puppet club to put on a performance at the church next Sunday. The characters become sexually attracted to each other. Jason's hand puppet, Tyrone, takes on a life of his own, announces that he is Satan, leads them into sin, and expresses secrets that the characters would rather have left unacknowledged.

Plot

Act 1
Prologue -
In an empty basement of a church “Somewhere in Texas where the country meets the city” a puppet stage is set up. From out of it pops a sock puppet who proceeds to talk about the beginning of mankind, where “we rutted as we chose careless in the night.” Then “some evil bastard” figured out many together could kill larger things, and women figured out more food meant less babies died. So humanity started camping and started making rules about doing bad things. Then “that same motherfucker who invented the group kill” invented the devil. The puppet leaves with a warning to the audience: “When I have acted badly, in order that I may stay around the campfire all I have to do is say…the devil made me do it.”

Scene 1 -
In the same church basement, Margery, a recently widowed mother, tries to teach a puppet class with a group of three clearly disinterested teenagers: Jessica, a nerdy and deadbeat young woman; Timothy, a horny and expletive-spouting young man; and Jason, Margery's introverted son. Of the three, only Jason and Jessica have brought their puppets, and Jason is the only one who has finished his––a sock puppet named Tyrone, the same one from the opening monologue. After Margery grows tired of Timothy's interruptions, she sends Jason and Jessica out in order to have a private talk with Timothy. Timothy promptly reveals his sexual infatuation with Margery which she awkwardly and bluntly rejects. Before Timothy can do any more, Pastor Greg, a middle-aged preacher at the church, walks in, cuing Timothy's exit. Pastor Greg, who is clearly infatuated with Margery (though not quite as much as Timothy), invites the puppet class to perform in front of the entire church next Sunday. Margery awkwardly accepts.

Scene 2 -
Outside on the playground, Jessica and Jason hang out on the swings. Jason has a rather obvious crush on Jessica, who is fascinated by Jason's constant use of Tyrone. Jason, hoping to impress her, performs an excerpt from "Who's on First?" with Tyrone. When his approach to impressing her resorts to lying that he made the skit up, Tyrone, as if on his own, calls Jessica stupid for not knowing the skit and revealing that Jason thinks she's hot. After a brief moment where Jessica and Jason are considering that this fact is in the air, Tyrone comes to life once more and begins telling Jessica about how Jason “thinks about you,” before Jason finally tears the puppet off. Jessica, embarrassed and more than a little scared, leaves.

Scene 3 -
In the car on the way home, Jason tries to tell Margery that he no longer wants to do the puppet class, which she refuses to listen to. It is clear to the audience their relationship has turned dysfunctional since the death of Jason's father from a heart attack earlier in the year. Despite Margery's insistence, Jason refuses to continue with the puppets, demonstrating this by ripping his puppet's head in half. Margery, hysterical, kicks an apologetic Jason out of the car.

Scene 4 -
The next day, Margery waits in the puppet classroom for her students, but none appear. Pastor Greg enters and tries to comfort her, and subsequently reveals his lust for her. Margery, who is still dealing with her problems at home, gently rejects him, which he does not take well, leaving her alone. Frustrated, she starts destroying parts of the classroom when Timothy enters with his puppet. After witnessing Margery's destructive rampage, he joins in on her command, their actions becoming increasingly sexual before they give in to their urges and engage in violent intercourse.

Scene 5 -
Jason is woken up in the morning by Tyrone, who has been sewn back together and had teeth added to his mouth. Tyrone, angered by Jason tearing him in half, harasses Jason for his dreams of a happy life and hope to live like his dad. Tyrone claims that Jason's father was miserable and ate himself to death because he resented his child. He convinces Jason to return to the church and tell everyone exactly what he thinks of them, and to act rude to Jessica so she will like him. Jason, with little choice, agrees.

Scene 6 -
Pastor Greg returns to the classroom to find it in shambles. As Margery and the students enter, she denies any knowledge, though Timothy is insistent on  reminding Margery it happened. While waiting for Margery to find her scripts, Tyrone proceeds to threaten Timothy, who gradually becomes aware something odd is going on. Jessica enters, and Tyrone proceeds to bluntly flirt with her. Margery leaves the classroom, prompting Timothy to harass Jessica, causing Tyrone to come to her defense, which Jessica assumes is Jason trying to be nice. However, Tyrone takes it to a whole new level, calling out Timothy for his insecurity and jerkiness, telling him to run off. Timothy, feeling bold, reveals to Jason he had sex with his mother. An enraged Tyrone attacks Timothy, biting off his ear against Jason's own pleas. Margery and Pastor Greg run in to see the commotion, and Margery insists “the devil’s got him.” Tyrone confirms this by causing an overhead lamp to abruptly burn out, and the congregation flees from the classroom, leaving Jason alone with Tyrone.

Act 2
Scene 1 -
After sewing Timothy's ear back on, the congregation try to figure out their next move. Margery insists on exorcism and they can all go home, but Jessica and Pastor Greg believe calling the police is the better option. Margery rejects this course of action, worried that they will take Jason away from her. Pastor Greg decides to take it upon himself to confront the boy.

Scene 2 -
Back in the basement, Tyrone, apparently with Jason's help, has turned the room into his own personal hell, with graffiti, torn up posters, mutilated stuffed animals, and crucified dolls. After a conversation with Jason, Tyrone refuses to reveal if he really is the devil or not, instead claiming that every action one could easily pin on the devil was really done by Jason, even the lightbulb turning off by itself. Pastor Greg arrives and tries to appeal to Jason by explaining he is trying to help his mother. Tyrone seizes the opportunity to reveal that Margery and Timothy had sex, and a horrified Pastor Greg stumbles out of the classroom back towards his office.

Scene 3 -
Timothy finds Margery alone in the office, and despite the pain of having lost his ear, still insists on his love for Margery. Relenting, Margery agrees to sleep with him one more time, but their tryst is interrupted: first by Jessica, who is looking for the keys to Margery's car to get the rest of the puppets; second by Pastor Greg. Upon seeing this, Margery rejects Timothy once more. Angered, he leaves, insisting he will tell everyone about her.

Pastor Greg, disgusted, goes to call the police, claiming he cannot keep Margery around if this is what she does. Margery finally snaps, calling out Pastor Greg for his lame attempt at a come-on, and shouting about Jason not being there for her after her husband's death and instead talking to a puppet. She tears pages out of Pastor Greg's Bible, complaining that not even the church has helped her with her troubles. After finally letting out all her repressed anger, she decides she is better off going to the police. Pastor Greg, however, has another idea.

Scene 4 -
Jason and Tyrone are still in the basement, but Jason is starting to grow restless being alone with his puppet. Tyrone's attempt to convince him otherwise is interrupted by Jessica coming in through the window with her puppet, a buxom character complete with button breasts named Jolene. Tyrone and Jolene proceed to engage in (highly vocal) sex. Jessica uses the distraction to finally get through to Jason, and asks him out to homecoming before leaving as Pastor Greg and Margery enter.

Pastor Greg has Margery talk to Jason directly. She tries to apologize for all her actions while talking over Tyrone's name-calling. Eventually, Tyrone grows so angry that he accuses Margery of killing “my father,” which causes Jason to go silent before he, as himself, angrily blames Margery for his father's death and tells her to leave, which she does reluctantly. Pastor Greg leaves with a warning to Jason that he needs to choose whether he or Tyrone gets out of the room.

Jason, alone once again, decides he has had enough of Tyrone's influence, and tries to remove the puppet from his hand. Tyrone, however, attacks his puppeteer, calling him ungrateful for his help. After a lengthy struggle, Jason finally removes the puppet from his hand. Thinking he has defeated the devil, he then grabs a towel and tries to treat the finger that Tyrone bit. However, Tyrone shows up again inside Jason's towel, and once again tries to kill his puppeteer. Jason finally manages to restrain Tyrone to a table and grabs a hammer to try to bludgeon the puppet to death, but Tyrone keeps reviving with each blow. With no other apparent choice, Jason turns the hammer around and prepares to slam the claw of the head straight into his hand. Before he can do this, Margery returns, sees what he's doing, and tries to stop him, resulting in her own hand getting impaled by the claw of the hammer. Jason, horrified by what he has done, runs to help his mother, and Tyrone does not revive when he handles the towel again. As the two leave the basement arm-in-arm for a hospital, Margery insists Jason tell her if Tyrone comes back, and she will be there for him.

Epilogue -
However, Tyrone emerges one last time from the shadows without Jason's help, now much larger and more demented looking than before. He mocks the audience for wanting to see him again, because that's what people want to do with the devil—you want him, and then you want him to go away. This resulted in humanity shifting the blame for their demons by killing the innocent, like sheep, lambs, and babies, before finally settling for killing the sweetest guy: Jesus. And humanity spends the last thousand years solving their problems by putting horns on them and watching their saviors burn. He disappears with one last warning to the audience: “The thing about a savior is you never know where to look. Might just be the place you saw the devil before.”

Cast 
Original Broadway Cast: 
 Steven Boyer as Jason/Tyrone
 Geneva Carr as Margery
 Michael Oberholtzer as Timmy
 Sarah Stiles as Jessica
 Marc Kudisch as Pastor Greg
On November 3, 2015 Bob Saget replaced Marc Kudisch as Pastor Greg.

Original London Cast:

 Harry Melling as Jason/Tyrone
 Janie Dee as Margery
 Kevin Mains as Timmy
 Jemima Rooper as Jessica
 Neil Pearson as Pastor Greg

Awards and nominations

References

External links

2011 plays
Broadway plays
Plays featuring puppetry
West End plays